Mizhhiria Raion was a raion of Zakarpattia Oblast in western Ukraine. Its administrative center was the urban-type settlement of Mizhhiria. The raion was abolished and its territory was merged into Khust Raion on 18 July 2020 as part of the administrative reform of Ukraine, which reduced the number of raions of Zakarpattia Oblast to six. The last estimate of the raion population was

See also
 Administrative divisions of Zakarpattia Oblast

References

External links
 mizgir.com.ua 

Former raions of Zakarpattia Oblast
1947 establishments in Ukraine
Ukrainian raions abolished during the 2020 administrative reform